Labor migration from Ukraine is a labor migration of citizens of Ukraine to the Post-Soviet states and foreign countries.

In Ukraine, a term to denote such migrants appeared — “заробітча́ни” (zarobitchany, En. Literary “earners”), which refers to the numerous Russian- and Ukrainian-speaking economic migrants (Gastarbeiter's)  working in Russian, in the West and in Kyiv, Ukraine's capital in 1990-2000-ies. The term is used in Russian- and Ukrainian-speaking media (mostly in Ukraine). The total number of labor migrants from Ukraine is estimated to be 4.5 million people. Their contribution to the economy of Ukraine is considerable. In particular, only Ukrainian labor migrants working in the EU countries sent 27 billion euros to Ukraine in 2007, which amounted to 8% of Ukraine's GDP.

According to the data of L. Drozdova, Deputy Minister for Social Policy, in 2013, the average salary of a labor migrant per month was 930 US dollars, while in Ukraine, it constituted 380.

See also
Economy of Ukraine

References

External links
 
 

Migrant workers
Demographics of Ukraine
Economy of Ukraine